Variimorda truncatopyga is a species of "tumbling flower beetles" in the subfamily Mordellinae of the family Mordellidae. It is found in China and Taiwan.

References

External links
 Biolib

Mordellidae
Beetles of Asia
Insects of China
Insects of Taiwan
Beetles described in 1938
Taxa named by Maurice Pic